Dumontinia is a fungal genus in the family Sclerotiniaceae. The genus is monotypic, containing the single species Dumontinia tuberosa, found in Europe.

The genus name of Dumontinia is in honour of Kent Parsons Dumont (b.1941), an American botanist (Mycology) from the New York Botanical Garden.

The genus was circumscribed by Linda M.Kohn in Mycotaxon Vol.9 (Issue 2) on page 432 in 1979.

References

Sclerotiniaceae
Fungi of Europe
Monotypic Leotiomycetes genera